Beyond Reason is an independent film directed, starring, and written by Telly Savalas that was produced in 1977.  Originally titled Mati, after the title character Dr. Nicholas Mati, the film focused on a psychiatrist who struggles with his grip on reality.  Diana Muldaur also starred in the film as Elaine Mati, the doctor's concerned wife. The film was not released theatrically, and became available on home media in 1985.

Plot
After witnessing the traumatic suicide of one of his patients, and much to the chagrin of his loving wife Elaine (Diana Muldaur), well-respected psychiatrist Dr. Nicolas Mati (Telly Savalas) begins to become unhinged. As he loses the grip on his sanity, his obsession with a demure young student intensifies.

Cast
Telly Savalas as Dr. Nicholas Mati
Diana Muldaur as Elaine Mati
Marvin Laird as Vincent
Bob Basso as Mario
Walter Brooke as Dr. Grovenor
Priscilla Barnes as Leslie Valentine #1
Laura Johnson as Leslie Valentine #2
Rita Marie Carr as Ann Rogers
Lilyan Chauvin as Geena
Biff Elliot as Big Bulge

Reception
The film was never released to theaters. In 1985 it was released to home media, and has received capsule reviews in video guides. One sympathetic author wrote "Telly Savalas shows his stuff in this sensitive film, which he wrote and directed. ... Though thought provoking and touching throughout, the story gets a little muddy from time to time and finishes unsatisfyingly."

References

External links

Films about psychiatry
American independent films
1977 films
1970s English-language films
1970s American films